Briukhovychi is an urban-type settlement in Lviv Raion, Lviv Oblast of Ukraine. It belongs to Lviv urban hromada, one of the hromadas of Ukraine. Between 1939 and 1942, and again from 1944 to 1957, Briukhovychi was the center of Briukhovychi Raion.

Location 
Briukhovychi is located at the center of Lviv Oblast and is bordered on the south by the city of Lviv, in the northeast by the villages Mali Hrybovychi and Volia-Homuletska. To the west is the village of Birky in Yavoriv Raion.

Briukovychi is located at the intersection of the Sian Lowland and the Roztocze. The European Watershed passes through the southwestern part of the village.

History 
Between 1774 and 1918 it was part of Austrian Galicia. After the end of World War I Briukhovychi became part of Lwów Powiat in Lwów Voivodeship, part of Poland. In 1939 it was annexed by the Soviet Union. It was given the status of an urban-type settlement in 1940.

Briukhovychi was occupied by German troops during World War II from 1941 to 1944.

Until 18 July 2020, Briukhovychi belonged to Lviv Municipality. The municipality was abolished in July 2020 as part of the administrative reform of Ukraine, which reduced the number of raions of Lviv Oblast to seven. The area of Lviv Municipality was merged into the newly established Lviv Raion.

References 

Urban-type settlements in Lviv Raion